The Bretagne-class battleships were the first "super-dreadnoughts" built for the French Navy during the First World War. The class comprised three vessels: Bretagne, the lead ship, Provence, and Lorraine. They were an improvement of the previous , and mounted ten  guns instead of twelve  guns as on the Courbets. A fourth was ordered by the Greek Navy, though work was suspended due to the outbreak of the war. The three completed ships were named after French provinces.

The three ships saw limited service during World War I, and were primarily occupied with containing the Austro-Hungarian Navy in the Adriatic Sea. After the war, they conducted training cruises in the Mediterranean and participated in non-intervention patrols off Spain during the Spanish Civil War. After the outbreak of World War II, the ships were tasked with convoy duties and anti-commerce raider patrols until the fall of France in June 1940. Bretagne and Provence were sunk by the British Royal Navy during the Attack on Mers-el-Kébir the following month; Provence was later raised and towed to Toulon, where she was again scuttled in November 1942. Lorraine was disarmed by the British in Alexandria and recommissioned in 1942 to serve with the Free French Naval Forces. She provided gunfire support during Operation Dragoon, the invasion of southern France, and shelled German fortresses in northern France. She survived as a gunnery training ship and a floating barracks until the early 1950s, before being broken up for scrap in 1954. Bretagne and Provence were scrapped in 1952 and 1949, respectively.

Design 
By 1910, France had yet to lay down a single dreadnought battleship; Britain had by then completed ten dreadnoughts and five battlecruisers, with eight and three more of the two types, respectively, under construction. Germany had built eight dreadnoughts and one battlecruiser and the United States had six built and four more building. Late that year, the French Navy laid down the first of the four  ships. To remedy the inferiority of the French fleet, the government passed the Statut Naval on 30 March 1912, authorizing a force of twenty-eight battleships, to be in service by 1920. The first three ships were to be laid down in 1912.

The Bretagne class were replacements for the battleships Carnot, Charles Martel and Liberté. They were developed from the Courbet class, and were built with the same hulls. The primary reason for the decision to use the same hull design as the Courbet class was limitations of French shipyards. The Courbet-class ships were the largest possible ships that could fit in existing dockyards and refitting basins. The Superior Naval Council ordered the construction department to prepare designs for a  ship armed with twelve  guns in six twin gun turrets.

To incorporate six turrets with the same arrangement of the earlier vessels, with four on the centerline in superfiring pairs and two wing turrets amidships would have required an additional  displacement as well as a significant increase in the length of the hull. After several other proposals, the Superior Naval Council chose a design with five twin turrets, all mounted on the centerline. This would achieve the same broadside of ten guns, despite the reduction in the number of guns.

Provence was the first ship of the class to be laid down, which she was on 21 May 1912 at the Arsenal de Lorient. Bretagne was laid down at the Arsenal de Brest shipyard in Brest on 22 July 1912. Lorraine followed at the Ateliers et Chantiers de la Loire shipyard in St. Nazaire almost six months later on 7 November 1912. Due to the outbreak of World War I in the summer of 1914, French industrial capacity was redirected to the army and work slowed on the ships. The Greek Navy ordered a battleship to be named Vasilefs Konstantinos to the same design from AC de St Nazaire Penhoet. Work began in June 1914 but ceased on the outbreak of war in August and never resumed. The contract dispute was settled in 1925.

General characteristics 

The crew included 34 officers, 139 petty officers, and 1,020 enlisted men, for a total crew of 1,193.

The ships' propulsion systems consisted of four Parsons steam turbines. Bretagne was equipped with twenty-four Niclausse boilers; Lorraine had the same number of Guyot du Temple boilers. Provence was equipped with eighteen Belleville boilers. All three ships were coal-fired.

The ships were modified several times in the interwar period. In 1919, Bretagne was equipped with a heavy tripod mast; Provence and Lorraine were given tripod masts in the early 1920s. Four of Bretagnes boilers were converted to oil-firing in 1924, and half of Provences boilers in the rear boiler room were similarly converted in 1927. Bretagne subsequently had six new oil-fired boilers to replace the rest of the old coal-fired boilers, and her direct drive turbines were replaced with Parsons geared turbines. Provence was similarly modified in 1931–1934. Lorraines propulsion system was improved in a similar pattern. In 1935, Lorraine had her center main battery turret replaced with an aircraft catapult and a hangar for three aircraft. These were initially Gourdou-Leseurre GL-819 and Potez 452 seaplanes, though they were replaced with the Loire 130 flying boat. In March–May 1944, the aircraft installation was removed.

Armament 

The ship's main battery consisted of ten 340mm/45 Modèle 1912 guns in five twin gun turrets. The turrets were mounted all on the centerline, with two in a superfiring pair forward of the conning tower, one amidships between the two funnels, and two superfiring aft of the rear superstructure. Bretagne and Provence were similarly modified after the end of the war in 1919. Each gun was supplied with 100 rounds of ammunition, stored in shell rooms located beneath the propellant magazines.

A secondary battery of twenty-two Canon de 138 mm Modèle 1910 guns were mounted in casemates along the length of the ship's hull. They were expected to be used offensively to attack the upper works of enemy battleships, as well as to defend against torpedo boat attacks. The secondary battery fire control consisted of two central directors four rangefinders, which were located abreast of the superfiring turrets, fore and aft. The ships carried seven 47 mm M1885 Hotchkiss quick-firing guns. Two were placed on the conning tower and one was placed on each main battery turret. During World War I, a pair of  guns were added. The ships' armament were rounded out by four  torpedo tubes. The tubes were submerged in the ships' hulls.

In the interwar period, all three ships had their armament rearranged. In 1919–1920, Bretagne had the four forwardmost of her 138 mm guns removed, along with the 75 mm and two of the 47 mm guns. In their place, four 75 mm mle 1897 guns were installed on the forward superstructure. Twenty-four  Hotchkiss machine guns were installed on the forecastle deck in 1927. The four rearmost 138 mm guns were removed during this refit, along with the 75 mm guns, which were replaced with eight 75 mm mle 1922 anti-aircraft guns. Sixteen 13.2 mm Hotchkiss machine guns, in quadruple mounts, were also added. Provence had her four forward 138 mm guns removed in 1919, and was equipped similarly to Bretagne. In 1931–1934, she received the same eight 75 mm guns as Bretagne did, and in 1940, three quadruple mounts of 13.2 mm guns were fitted. Lorraine followed a similar pattern, though in 1935, her center main battery turret was removed; an aircraft catapult was fitted in its place. At this time, four  Model M1930 guns were added, along with two of the 13.2 mm quadruple mounts. In 1940, the 100 mm guns were removed to arm the new battleship Richelieu, and eight 75 mm M1922 guns replaced them. In March–May 1944, fourteen  and twenty-five  guns in single mounts were added, and the quadruple 13.2 mm guns were removed.

Fire control 
The Bretagnes were provided with  Barr and Stroud rangefinders. Each turret had  rangefinder under an armoured hood at the rear of the turret. Between the wars, fire-control directors were added for the main, secondary and anti-aircraft armament. The rangefinder on the forward superfiring turret was replaced by a  instrument.

Armor 
The upper and lower decks were both 40 mm thick. The superfiring turrets were less well protected, with 270 mm thick sides.

Ships

Service history 
All three ships of the class entered service with the French Navy in 1916. Bretagne and Lorraine were assigned to the 1st Division of the 1st Battle Squadron, while Provence served as the fleet flagship for the entirety of the First World War. They were deployed to guard the southern end of the Adriatic Sea, based in Argostoli and Corfu, to block a possible sortie by the Austro-Hungarian fleet. The three ships largely remained in port, though Provence was repeatedly used to intimidate the government of Greece, which favored Germany during the war. In January 1919, after the end of the war, Lorraine was sent to Cattaro to guard the Austro-Hungarian fleet. She joined her sisters in Toulon in June 1919; later that year the ships formed the Eastern Mediterranean Fleet until 1921.

Financial problems forced the French Navy to reduce its battleship force to four active vessels. Lorraine and Provence were reduced to reserve status in 1922, and the latter went into drydock for a major overhaul. Lorraine returned to service with the Mediterranean Squadron in 1923. Bretagne remained in service and conducted training cruises in the Mediterranean and along the coast of North Africa during the 1920s and 1930s. In 1934, Bretagne and Provence were assigned to the 2nd Squadron, based on France's Atlantic coast. In 1936, they joined the non-intervention patrols off Spain during the Spanish Civil War. At the outbreak of World War II in September 1939, Bretagne and Provence were based in Toulon with the 2nd Squadron, while Lorraine was assigned to the Atlantic Squadron.

After undergoing a refit in the early months of the war, Provence conducted anti-raider patrols with Force Y, based in Casablanca. Bretagne was also overhauled early in the war; in March 1940 she escorted a convoy to Halifax and returned with another convoy loaded with aircraft for the French Air Force. She was then ordered to join Lorraine in Force X, to be based in Alexandria to operate in concert with the British Mediterranean Fleet. Two weeks later, Bretagne was instead ordered to steam at high speed to Bizerte, to join the Force de Raid with Provence. The ships put in at Mers-el-Kébir and remained there until after the fall of France in June 1940. To prevent the ships of the French Navy from falling into the hands of the occupying Germans, British Prime Minister Winston Churchill ordered the neutralization of all French warships. Force H was to deliver an ultimatum to the ships based at Mers-el-Kébir; on 3 July, the British squadron arrived outside the harbor and demanded that the ships sail with them to Britain or they would be sunk.

The British and French negotiated for several hours, and culminated in the British opening fire on the French fleet. In the span of ten minutes, Bretagne was sunk and Provence was badly damaged. Provence was set on fire and sank to the bottom of the harbor, though she was subsequently raised and transferred to Toulon, where she was later scuttled in 1942 to prevent her from being seized by the Germans. They nevertheless salvaged the ship starting in July 1943. Two of her main guns were emplaced as coastal batteries outside Toulon. Lorraine was disarmed in Alexandria until December 1942, when she joined the Free French Naval Forces. She served as a training ship for much of 1943 until a major refit at the end of the year to prepare her to participate in Operation Dragoon, the invasion of southern France. She provided gunfire support during the landings before steaming to Britain for a minor refit. She remained in Britain until March 1945, when she bombarded German-held fortresses in northern France.

After the end of the war, Lorraine served as a gunnery training ship in Toulon. She was then used as a barracks ship until February 1953, when she was stricken from the naval register and sold for scrapping at the end of the year. She was broken up for scrap outside Toulon the following year. Bretagne remained at the bottom of Mers-el-Kébir until she was raised for scrapping in 1952 and broken up. Provence was raised in April 1949 and scrapped.

Footnotes

References

Further reading 

 
 

 

Battleship classes
 
Bretagne class battleship
Bretagne class battleship
Ship classes of the French Navy